Odin is an ambient music album by Julian Cope, released in 1999. It is Cope's third album of ambient music and his fifteenth solo album overall.

The album is a 73-minute-long vocal drone piece interwoven with Mellotron and is referred to by Cope as “a simultaneously-synthesized parallel-harmonic Breathing Meditation.” It was recorded in one take, as Cope explained, "The preparation of the studio took six hours, but the performance was entirely live like a concert and without overdubs."

Track listing

Personnel 
Julian Cope – vocals, mellotron, keyboards
Thighpaulsandra – producer, recorded by (credited as Cliff Cheerio)
 Lisa Bennett – artwork, design

References

External links 
Odin on Discogs.com

1999 albums
Julian Cope albums
Norse mythology in music
Odin